Charles Mark Drazenovich (August 7, 1927 – February 27, 1992) was an American football linebacker who played his entire ten-year career with the Washington Redskins from 1950 to 1959 in the National Football League.  He played college football at Penn State University and was drafted in the ninth round of the 1949 NFL Draft. Drazenovich played in four Pro Bowls (1955–1958) and was selected as one of the 80 Greatest Redskins. From 1964 to 1967 he was a radio announcer for the team.

References

External links

1927 births
1992 deaths
American football linebackers
Eastern Conference Pro Bowl players
National Football League announcers
Penn State Nittany Lions football players
People from Monongalia County, West Virginia
Washington Redskins players
Washington Redskins announcers